This list of diplomatic missions in Singapore is made up of 74 embassies/high commissions, several foreign consular posts and 11 international organisations. It does not include honorary consuls.  Countries without any forms of diplomatic representations in Singapore have accredited non-resident ambassadors or high commissioners to the island city-state.

Due to the high cost of land for rent in Singapore, many countries operate their embassies or high commissions in an office unit within a commercial building. Nevertheless, there are countries that have chanceries to house their missions, namely Australia, Brunei, China, France, India, Indonesia, Israel, Japan, Malaysia, Myanmar, Philippines, Russia, Switzerland, Thailand, United Kingdom, United States, and Vietnam.

Resident foreign Embassies and High Commissions

Missions in Singapore

Multinational organisations
Asia-Europe Foundation
Asia-Pacific Economic Cooperation 
International Monetary Fund (IMF)
IMF - Singapore Regional Training Institute
Japan International Cooperation Agency
Pacific Economic Cooperation Council
World Health Organization
Multilateral Investment Guarantee Agency (MIGA)
ReCAAP Information Sharing Centre (ISC)
Regional Emerging Diseases Intervention (REDI) Center 
World Intellectual Property Organization
World Bank

Accredited embassies and high commissions

Resident in Beijing, China:

 
 
 
 

 
 

  
 

Resident in New Delhi, India:

 

Resident in Jakarta, Indonesia:

 
 

 
 

 
   

 
 

 

 

Resident in Tokyo, Japan:

 
 
 
 
 
 
 
 
 
 

 

Resident in Bangkok, Thailand:

Resident elsewhere:

 (Reykjavik)
 (Tehran)
 (Riga)
 (Valletta)
 (Windhoek)
 (Seoul)
  (Canberra)
 (Kuala Lumpur)
 (Mbabane)
 (Canberra)
 (Seoul)
 (Hanoi)
 (Kuala Lumpur)

See also
List of diplomatic missions of Singapore
Foreign relations of Singapore
Visa policy of Singapore 
Visa requirements for Singaporean citizens

References

Ministry of Foreign Affairs Singapore
 Diplomatic list

 
Singapore
Diplomatic missions in Singapore